The Juno Award for Children's Album of the Year has been awarded since 1979 in recognition of the best quality children's performance album released in Canada. Between 1979 and 2002 it was known as Best Children's Album.

Winners

Best Children's Album (1979 - 2002)

Children's Album of the Year (2003 - Present)

References 

Children's Album
Children's albums
Album awards